Salvatore Scianamea (31 May 1919 – 4 August 2002) was a Brazilian fencer. He competed in the individual foil and team épée events at the 1948 Summer Olympics.

References

External links
 

1919 births
2002 deaths
Brazilian male foil fencers
Olympic fencers of Brazil
Fencers at the 1948 Summer Olympics
Brazilian male épée fencers
20th-century Brazilian people